The following is the list of episodes for the Japanese anime series Special A. The episodes are produced by AIC and GONZO, directed by Yoshikazu Miyao and composed by Jukki Hanada. Characters are adapted from the manga drawn by Maki Minami. It is currently airing in Japan on Chiba TV and various other stations. Broadcast on Chiba TV began on 6 April 2008 and continued for 24 episodes, ending on 14 September 2008.

The series has been given four different theme songs, two opening themes and two ending themes.  All the theme songs were performed by the seven principal cast members: Yūko Gotō, Jun Fukuyama, Hitomi Nabatame, Hiro Shimono, Tsubasa Yonaga, Kazuma Horie, and Ayahi Takagaki.

The anime is licensed by Mighty Media Co., Ltd in China and Taiwan and Sentai Filmworks in America and Canada.  Special A premiered in the Philippines on February 26, 2009 and ended on March 31, 2009 through TV5. The show premiered 5 months after it ended in Japan making it the fastest acquired anime title on Philippine free TV history.  It is the first country in Southeast Asia to air the series outside Japan. This anime was aired in South Korea via Animax, marking it as the first country in East Asia and second in Asia to air the series outside Japan.

Episodes

References

External links
 Special A - official site for the anime

Special A